The Commandant of the Indian Naval Academy is the head and in-charge of all the functioning of the Indian Naval Academy. The commandant of the academy is a three-star rank officer holding the rank of vice admiral. He is supported by the deputy commandant, a two-star appointment and the heads of the Academic Wing (rear admiral principal), Training Wing (commodore rank officer) and the Admin wing (commodore rank officer). The current commandant is Vice Admiral Puneet Kumar Bahl.

History
The Naval Academy (NAVAC) was set up in Cochin in 1969 as a temporary institution, to train officers for the Navy. The first Officer-in-charge (OIC) was Commander Laxminarayan Ramdas. The title of the head of the institution changed to commandant in 1980. The academy moved to Goa in 1986 under Commandants Captain M.S. Bedi and Captain O.P. Bansal. In 2008, the academy moved to Ezhimala in Kerala and was re-christened the Indian Naval Academy (INA). Rear Admiral M. P. Muralidharan took over as the first commandant of INA.

List of Commandants

See also 
 Commandant of the Indian Military Academy
 Commandant of the Air Force Academy
 Commandant of the National Defence Academy
 Commandant of the Officers Training Academy, Chennai

References

Notes

Bibliography
 

Indian Navy
Military academies of India
Indian military appointments
Indian Navy appointments